Phyllis Marie Robinson (born September 11, 1946) is an American retired politician.

Robinson was born on September 11, 1946 in Gonzales, Texas. She attended Southwest Texas State University, graduating in 1967, after which she completed a master's degree at St. Mary's University in 1972. Before running for the Texas House of Representatives, Robinson was a teacher. From 1983 to 1991, Robinson held office as a conservative Democrat. She was the first woman to represent state house district 31.

References

1946 births
Living people
20th-century American women politicians
20th-century American women educators
Schoolteachers from Texas
People from Gonzales, Texas
Democratic Party members of the Texas House of Representatives
Women state legislators in Texas
Texas State University alumni
20th-century American educators
20th-century American politicians